The 2001 Betty Barclay Cup was a women's tennis tournament played on outdoor clay courts at Am Rothenbaum in Hamburg, Germany and was part of Tier II of the 2001 WTA Tour. It was the 17th edition of the tournament and was held from 1 May until 6 May 2001. First-seeded Venus Williams won the singles title and earned $90,000 first-prize money.

Finals

Singles

 Venus Williams defeated  Meghann Shaughnessy 6–3, 6–0
 It was Williams' 3rd title of the year and the 25th of her career.

Doubles

 Cara Black /  Elena Likhovtseva defeated  Květa Hrdličková /  Barbara Rittner 6–2, 4–6, 6–2
 It was Black's 2nd title of the year and the 3rd of her career. It was Likhovtseva's 2nd title of the year and the 11th of her career.

External links
 ITF tournament edition details
 Tournament draws

Betty Barclay Cup
WTA Hamburg
2001 in German women's sport
2001 in German tennis